Urbánek is a surname of Czech/Slovak origin, derived from the name Urban. It may refer to:

 Aleš Urbánek (born 1980), Czech footballer
 Jim Urbanek (1945–2009), American football player
 Johann Urbanek (1910–2000), Austrian footballer
 Karel Urbánek (born 1941), Czech communist politician
 Robert Urbanek (born 1987), Polish discus thrower

See also